Wilhelm Weiss (German Wilhelm Weiß) (31 March 1892 in Stadtsteinach – 24 February 1950 in Wasserburg am Inn) was, in the time of the Third Reich, an SA-Obergruppenführer as well as editor-in-chief of the NSDAP's official newspaper, the Völkischer Beobachter

Early career
After finishing his studies at the Gymnasium in Munich, Weiss began a career as a soldier. By 1911 he was an ensign (Fahnenjunker) and by 1913 a lieutenant. During the First World War, Weiss was transferred in 1915 to the Airmen's Squad (Fliegertruppe). On one of his battle deployments, he was shot down, as a result of which he lost his left leg. Nonetheless, in 1917, he was promoted to Oberleutnant before being transferred to the Bavarian War Ministry in 1918, shortly before the war ended. Through his activities in the Bavarian War Ministry's press department, Weiss came to journalism after the First World War. In 1920, when it turned out that the Reichswehr, which was busy reconstituting itself, could no longer find a job for him, he was discharged with the rank of captain.

Already by 1919, Weiss had been busying himself as a member of the state leadership of the Bavarian Inhabitants' Defence (Einwohnerwehr), through which he was appointed editor of the magazine Heimatland (Homeland), a publication with strongly NSDAP (the Nazi Party) leanings. He became involved early on in the völkisch movement and was a fervent devotee of Adolf Hitler's ideas. Before 1933, the year of the NSDAP's seizure of power, he was judicially sentenced many times for political misdeeds. However, after Hitler and the Nazi Party had come to power, Weiss organized the "equalization" of the press, though he also saw to it that individual journalists could keep their jobs despite the Editor Law (Schriftleitergesetz). Weiss never questioned Nazism.

NSDAP

In 1922 – as one of the first members – Weiss joined the Nazi Party and participated in the Beerhall Putsch and the March on the Feldherrnhalle.

Between 1924 and 1926, Weiss held a position as editor-in-chief of the Völkischer Kurier, until January 1927 when he became Office Chief at the editorial department of the Völkischer Beobachter (VB).

A military career advance came in 1930 when Weiss was appointed an SA-Oberführer on the Supreme SA Leadership's staff. At the same time, Weiss was given leadership of the SA press office. Besides his work on the VB, Weiss also functioned as editor-in-chief of the anti-Semitic magazine Die Brennessel ("Stinging Nettle"), and in 1932, he became leader of the Central Writing Leadership of the Nazi Party's central publishing house. Only in 1933 did Weiss become acting editor-in-chief, and as of 1938 as Alfred Rosenberg's successor, fully-fledged editor-in-chief of the VB.

Further important functions bestowed upon Weiss between 1933 and 1945 were leader of the Reich Association of the German Press, and in the same period Member of the Reichstag. Having been promoted to SA-Gruppenführer in February 1934, he functioned as of July in the same year as a member of the Volksgerichtshof. In 1935, Weiss became a member of the Reich Culture Senate, and in 1936 Main Office Leader (Hauptamtsleiter) in the Nazi Party's Reich leadership. In 1937 came Weiss's promotion to SA-Obergruppenführer.

Post-War
In 1945, after the Second World War had ended, Weiss was interned, and on 15 July 1949 a denazification court sentenced him to three years in a labour camp, confiscated 30% of his wealth, and placed a 10-year ban on his professional activities.

Shortly before he began his sentence, Wilhelm Weiss died, about a month short of his 58th birthday.

Books
Wilhelm Weiss (editor). Der Krieg im Westen (War in the West). Dargestellt nach den Berichten des Völkischen Beobachters. 301 pp. Eher Verlag, 1940. This popular book went through 5 editions by 1942.
Wilhelm Weiss (editor). Triumph der Kriegskunst (Triumph of the Art of War). Das Kriegsjahr 1940 in der Darstellung des "Völkischen Beobachters". With a contribution from Generalfeldmarschall Kesselring. Eher Verlag 1941. High ranking accounts of Norway and the Fall of France; contributors include Kesselring, Todt, Prentzel, Lutzow and others. 
Wilhelm Weiss; Wilhelm Stuckart; Walter Buch; and others. Illustrierter Beobachter. Adolf Hitler - Ein Mann und sein Volk. Verlag Franz Eher Nachf., Munich (1936). This book is profusely Illustrated with reproductions of photos of Hitler from 1916 through 1936. It includes considerable text submitted by many prominent contributors in addition to Weiss and others listed.

References

External links
 

1892 births
1950 deaths
People from Stadtsteinach
Nazi Party politicians
Members of the Reichstag of the Weimar Republic
Members of the Reichstag of Nazi Germany
Nazis who participated in the Beer Hall Putsch
Nazi Party members
German editors
German male journalists
German Army personnel of World War I
People from the Kingdom of Bavaria
Sturmabteilung officers
Military personnel of Bavaria
German male writers
20th-century Freikorps personnel
20th-century German journalists